Émile Dalifard (22 August 1888 – 14 September 1961) was a French racing cyclist. He rode in the 1921 Tour de France.

References

1888 births
1961 deaths
French male cyclists
Place of birth missing